Philip Gerald Drazin (25 May 1934 – 10 January 2002) was a British mathematician and a leading international expert in fluid dynamics.

He completed his PhD at the University of Cambridge under G. I. Taylor in 1958. He was awarded the Smith's Prize in 1957. After leaving Cambridge, he spent two years at MIT before moving to the University of Bristol, where he stayed and became a Professor until retiring in 1999. After retiring, he lectured at the University of Oxford and the University of Bath until his death in 2002.

Drazin worked on hydrodynamic stability and the transition to turbulence. His 1974 paper On a model of instability of a slowly-varying flow introduced the concept of a global mode solution to a system of partial differential equations such as the Navier-Stokes equations. He also worked on solitons.

In 1998 he was awarded the Symons Gold Medal of the Royal Meteorological Society.

References

External links
 Philip Gerald Drazin at the Mathematics Genealogy Project
 Drazin's 1974 paper
 Drazin's obituary by Christopher Budd

1934 births
2002 deaths
Fluid dynamicists
20th-century British mathematicians
Alumni of the University of Cambridge
Academics of the University of Bristol